Sun, Sex and Suspicious Parents is a British documentary/reality television series aired on BBC Three from 4 January 2011 – 8 July 2015.

Concept
People in their late teens and early twenties go on their first girls'/lads' holiday abroad under the belief that they are getting away from their parents. However, their parents are also sent to the holiday destination and secretly watch footage of their children on video screens and also spy in their hotel rooms and at nightclub locations. The parents then reveal themselves on the last night of the holiday, to the dismay of the children, and tell them what they've seen and learned.

Viewing figures
The 2012 series regularly hit high viewing figures for a digital television programme. The Ayia Napa episode was the "most watched multichannels show" of 15 February 2012 with 1.26 million viewers, beating The Only Way Is Essex. 
The Malia episode had 899,000 viewers whilst the Ibiza episode was reportedly the most watched programme of the series, with 1.42 million viewers according to BARB.

On BBC Three in the UK, Sun, Sex and Suspicious Parents was the number one unscripted show of 2012, doubling the slot average and was also the most requested show on the BBC iPlayer catch-up service during February 2012.

Press reviews
The programme has been met with many national reviews. The Metro called the programme "brilliantly tacky" and said it's enough to make people "practically wet themselves with excitement". However, not all reviews were so light-hearted with The Guardian calling it "one to miss" and The Independent saying it's "one of BBC3's more obnoxious offerings".

Episodes
Episode viewing figures are provided by BARB.

Series 1 (2011)
Series 1 first aired on BBC Three on 4 January 2011, having been filmed throughout the summer season of 2010.

Series 2 (2012)
Series 2 premiered on BBC Three on 25 January 2012 having been filmed throughout the summer season of 2011. The series consists of seven episodes.

Series 3 (2013)
The BBC began recruiting for a new series called "The Big Vacation" during 2012.

This was later confirmed to be the third series of Sun, Sex and Suspicious Parents, consisting of eight episodes. The series began on 8 January 2013 at 9pm, include seven holiday episodes and one recap episode which will include the best participants from the series. The BBC confirmed these reports on 4 December 2012 when they advertised new programmes being introduced to the channel, which included a short clip from the new series of Sun, Sex and Suspicious Parents.

Series 4: Thailand (2014)
Series four began on 13 January 2014 and branches out beyond Europe for the first time. It features individuals travelling to Thailand, who were told that they were being filmed for a show called "Thailand Style".

Series 5 (2015)
The fifth series of Sun, Sex and Suspicious Parents started airing on 30 June 2015 on BBC3 and consisted of two episodes.

Snow, Sex and Suspicious Parents

Series 1
In addition to recommissioning series four, a spin-off series was commissioned for late 2013. The first series, consisting of four episodes, began in November 2013.

Series 2

Festivals, Sex and Suspicious Parents

Series one began airing on 26 February 2014, which featured individuals travelling to music festivals within the UK. The second series began to air 26 May 2015 on BBC Three, this series saw groups of young adults heading to music festivals abroad.

Series 1

Series 2

Freshers, Sex and Suspicious Parents

Transmissions

Other broadcasts
Portugal saw its own version in 2013, "Sol, Sexo e Pais a Assistir", and as of June 2016 repeats of the show air on 4Music.

References

External links

Snow, Sex and Suspicious Parents
Festivals, Sex and Suspicious Parents

2011 British television series debuts
2010s British travel television series
2015 British television series endings
BBC Television shows
2010s British reality television series
English-language television shows
Television series by Banijay
Television shows set in Cumbria
Television shows set in Cyprus
Television shows set in France
Television shows set in Greece
Television shows set in Norfolk
Television shows set in Spain
Television shows set in Thailand